Acarodynerus batchelorensis is a species of wasp in the family Vespidae. It was described by Borsato in 1994.

References

Potter wasps
Insects described in 1994